Alek Thomas (born April 28, 2000) is an American professional baseball outfielder for the Arizona Diamondbacks of Major League Baseball (MLB). He made his MLB debut in 2022.

Amateur career
Thomas attended Mount Carmel High School in Chicago, Illinois. He committed to play both college baseball and college football at Texas Christian University. During his high school career he hit .423 with 40 home runs and 158 runs batted in (RBIs). He was drafted by the Arizona Diamondbacks in the second round of the 2018 Major League Baseball draft.

Professional career
Thomas spent his first professional season with the Arizona League Diamondbacks and Missoula Osprey, batting .333 with two home runs, 27 RBIs, and 12 stolen bases in 56 games between the two teams. He started 2019 with the Kane County Cougars. In July, he was selected to play in the All-Star Futures Game. In August, he was promoted to the Visalia Rawhide, with whom he finished the year. Over 114 games between the two teams, Thomas slashed .300/.379/.450 with ten home runs, 55 RBIs, and 15 stolen bases.

Thomas did not play a minor league game in 2020 due to the cancellation of the minor league season caused by the COVID-19 pandemic. He began the 2021 season with the Amarillo Sod Poodles. In June, Thomas was selected to play in the All-Star Futures Game. He was promoted to the Reno Aces in August. Over 106 games between the two teams, he slashed .313/.394/.559 with 18 home runs, 59 RBIs, and 29 doubles. He opened the 2022 season back with Reno, and hitting .277/.362/.495/.857 with 4 home runs and 14 RBI over 24 games.

On May 8, 2022, Arizona selected his contract and he was promoted to the active roster for the first time. On May 11, he hit his first career home run off of Sandy Alcántara of the Miami Marlins.

International career
Thomas represented the United States at the 2017 U-18 Baseball World Cup and Mexico at the 2023 World Baseball Classic. Thomas was named to the 2017 U-18 All-World Team after recording a .361 batting average en route to a gold medal.

Personal life
Thomas' father, Allen, was the longtime strength and conditioning coach of the Chicago White Sox. His mother, Marcella, "has roots" in Sonora and Thomas has family in Agua Prieta.

References

External links

2000 births
Living people
2023 World Baseball Classic players
Amarillo Sod Poodles players
Arizona Diamondbacks players
Arizona League Diamondbacks players
Baseball players from Tucson, Arizona
Kane County Cougars players
Major League Baseball outfielders
Missoula Osprey players
Reno Aces players
Visalia Rawhide players
American baseball players of Mexican descent